Kenneth Obinna Okolie  (born February 21, 1984) is a Nigerian actor and model who was crowned Mr Nigeria in 2010 and in 2015 won the City People Movie Award for Best Supporting Actor of the Year (English) at the City People Entertainment Awards.

Early life and education
Okolie is a native of Ihiala in Anambra state a southeastern geographical area of Nigeria predominantly occupied by the Igbo people of Nigeria. Okolie is the first born child of his parents and has three siblings. He graduated with a B.Sc. degree from Valley View University in Ghana.

Modeling and acting career
Okolie before his debut into the Nigerian movie industry began as a model in 2006, in which he described as a coincidence as he merely escorted a friend to an audition for models and never intended to participate in the auditioning process but was compelled to audition by those conducting the audition of which he accepted their request and auditioned. He was successful in the audition and was selected hence debuting his career as a model. In 2010, four years after debuting his modeling career, Okolie participated in the Mr Nigeria male pageant and won. Okolie after winning the pageant, proceeded to the Mister World pageant and emerged as the second runner. Okolie debuted into the Nigerian movie industry in 2011. Okolie described his venture into the Nigerian movie industry as a coincidence as well as he never intended to be an actor.

Award
Okolie won the City People Movie Award for Best Supporting Actor of the Year (English) at the City People Entertainment Awards.

Personal life
Okolie married Nwaka Jessica in 2017 and in 2019 gave birth to their first child.

2012 Kidnap case
In 2012 Okolie travelled to Owerri which is the capital of Imo state for the purpose of shooting a movie alongside Nollywood colleague; Nkiru Sylvanus. It was reported that on December 15 both Okolie and Nkiru Sylvanus had been abducted and a ransom of ₦100,000,000 (One hundred million naira) which was per exchange rate in 2012 equivalent to $640,000 (Six Hundred and forty thousand U.S dollars) was demanded by their captors in exchange for their release. On December 21, 2012 at 10:30pm on the 6th day since their kidnap Okolie and co-actor Nkiru Sylvanus were released from captivity and regained freedom. The amount eventually paid in exchange for their release was never reported by the Nigerian media.

Selected filmography

TV series

Awards and nominations

References

External links

Living people
1984 births
21st-century Nigerian male actors
Igbo male actors
Nigerian male models
Igbo male models
Male actors from Anambra State
Nigerian male film actors
Nigerian male television actors
Kidnapped Nigerian people
Nigerian film producers
Nigerian film award winners
20th-century births